The Year That Trembled is a 2002 American romantic war drama film directed by Jay Craven and starring Jonathan Brandis, Marin Hinkle, Martin Mull, Meredith Monroe and Fred Willard.  It is based on Scott Lax's novel of the same name.

Cast
Jonathan Brandis as Casey Pedersen
Meredith Monroe as Judy Woods
Marin Hinkle as Helen Kerrigan
Jonathan M. Woodward as Charlie Kerrigan
Charlie Finn as Jim "Hairball" Morton
Sean Nelson as Phil Robbins
Jay R. Ferguson as Isaac Hoskins
Kiera Chaplin as Jennifer Treman
Fred Willard as Frank Woods
Martin Mull as Wayne Simonelli
Lucas Ford as Johnny Kenston
Henry Gibson as Ralph Tyler
Bill Raymond as Ernie Whirly
Matt Salinger as Professor Jeff Griggs

References

External links
 
 

American romantic drama films
American war drama films
Films based on American novels
2000s English-language films
2000s American films